Cai Jiayun is a Chinese paralympic cross country skier.

Career
He represented China at the 2022 Winter Paralympics and won a silver medal in the 20 kilometre classical event with a time of 54:27.7, and a bronze medal in the 12.5 kilometre free event with a time of 33:18.0.

References 

Living people
Place of birth missing (living people)
Year of birth missing (living people)
Cross-country skiers at the 2022 Winter Paralympics
Medalists at the 2022 Winter Paralympics
Paralympic silver medalists for China
Paralympic bronze medalists for China
Paralympic medalists in cross-country skiing